Central Township is a township in Barton County, Missouri, USA.  As of the 2000 census, its population was 512.

The township was named for its location near the geographical center of Barton County.

Geography
According to the USGS, it contains one cemetery, Iantha.

References

 USGS Geographic Names Information System (GNIS)

External links
 US-Counties.com
 City-Data.com

Townships in Barton County, Missouri
Townships in Missouri